Quinlan is an Irish surname, also used as a given name.  Notable people with the name include:

Surname
 Anthony Quinlan (born 1984), English actor
 Arthur Quinlan (1921–2012), Irish journalist
 Bernard Quinlan (1885–1950), Australian cricketer and doctor
 Bernie Quinlan (born 1951), former Australian rules footballer 
 Carrie Quinlan, British actress and comedy writer
 Derek Quinlan (born 1947), Irish businessman
 Frances Quinlan, (born 1986?), American musician
 Jack Quinlan (1927–1965), American sportscaster
 James Quinlan (1833–1906), Union Army officer during the American Civil War
 Jim Quinlan (1922–2003), American professional basketball player
 Jim Quinlan (1934–2020), American screenwriter and author
 Jimmy Quinlan (born 1981), Canadian lacrosse player
 John Quinlan (bishop) (1826–1883), Roman Catholic bishop
 John Quinlan (wrestler) (born 1974)
 Karen Ann Quinlan (1954–1985), figure in the "right to die" debate in the United States
 Karen Louise Quinlan , Australian art gallery director
 Kathleen Quinlan (born 1954), American actress
 Maeve Quinlan (born 1964), American actress
 Michael Quinlan (1930–2009), British permanent secretary to the Ministry of Defence
 Michael Quinlan, Australian musician, active 1986–1990
 Michael R. Quinlan (born 1944), American businessman
 Pat Quinlan (Irish Army officer) (1919–1997), the commanding officer of the Irish UN forces at the Siege of Jadotville
 Patrick Quinlan (author), American author and political activist
 Patrick Quinlan (cricketer) (1891–1935), Australian cricketer
 Patrick Quinlan (politician) (died 2001), Irish academic and politician
 Patrick L. Quinlan (1883–1948), Irish-American radical journalist and political activist
 Peter Quinlan, Chief Justice of Western Australia from 2018
 Quinlan (baseball), baseball player
 Robb Quinlan (born 1977), former Major League Baseball player
 Roberta Quinlan, American musician
 Ross Quinlan, computer scientist
 Thomas Quinlan (impresario) (1881–1951), musical impresario
 Thomas F. Quinlan (died 1970), Irish Roman Catholic bishop in Korea
 Thomas J. Quinlan (1929–2012), Roman Catholic priest
 Timothy Quinlan (1861–1927), Australian politician
 Tom Quinlan (born 1968), former Major League Baseball player
 Will J. Quinlan (1877–1963), American artist

Given name
 Quinlan Terry (born 1937), English architect

Fictional characters
 Quinlan Vos, a Jedi Master in the Star Wars franchise
 Todd Quinlan, aka "The Todd", a fictional character in the TV series Scrubs

Anglicised Irish-language surnames